Mutford and Lothingland was a hundred of Suffolk, with an area of . Lowestoft Ness, the most easterly point of Great Britain fell within its bounds.

Мutford and Lothingland Hundred formed the north-eastern corner of Suffolk. Its border with Norfolk was formed by the River Waveney as it bends north on its final approaches to the sea, and Breydon Water. It was separated to the south by the appropriately named Hundred River from the hundreds of Wangford and Blything.

The parishes of Belton with Browston, Bradwell, Burgh Castle and Hopton-on-Sea, historically in Suffolk, were moved to Great Yarmouth district in Norfolk in 1974 following the changes of the Local Government Act 1972.

The southern part of the hundred was formerly the Half Hundred of Mutford, comprising the parishes of Barnby, Carlton Colville, Gisleham, Kessingland, Kirkley, Mutford, Pakefield, and Rushmere. It was separated from Lothingland by Oulton Broad and Lake Lothing through which the River Waveney formerly flowed to reach the sea. The northern Half Hundred of Lothingland was merged with that of Mutford in 1763.

Listed as Ludingaland in the Domesday Book, Lothingland is named after Lake Lothing, which in turn probably refers to a tribe or family named Luthings. The name Mutford, taken from the village of the same name, may mean "ford near the meeting of the streams", from the Anglo-Saxon mutha meaning mouth of a river. If this is correct, the ford in question is presumably that where a stream enters the Hundred River in the grounds of Mutford Hall.

Parishes

Mutford and Lothingland Hundred consisted of the following 24 parishes:

References

See also
Lothingland
Lothingland Rural District

Hundreds of Suffolk